Gilbert Azibert is a former French magistrate who was on the Court of Cassation.

Azibert was a co-defendant in the Nicolas Sarkozy corruption trial, along with former French President Nicolas Sarkozy and the president's former lawyer, Thierry Herzog. Like the other two defendants, Azibert would be convicted.

References 

Living people
Court of Cassation (France) judges
Year of birth missing (living people)